Sir John Strange  (1696 – 18 May 1754) was a British politician and judge.

John Strange's life

He was born to another John Strange of Fleet Street, London and his second wife, Mary Plaistowe. He studied Law at the Middle Temple on 11 July 1712 before starting a pupillage at the chambers of Charles Salkeld, who trained (among others) Lord Hardwicke. He was called to the Bar on 27 October 1718.

In 1735 he bought the lease of Leyton Grange House in Leyton, then in Essex. In 1725 he represented Lord Macclesfield at his impeachment, and he was made a King's Counsel on 9 February 1736. The same year, he became a Bencher of Middle Temple.

He was appointed Solicitor General for England and Wales on 28 January 1737, and was made a Member of Parliament for West Looe to allow him to take his position. After the death of the Master of the Rolls Joseph Jekyll on 19 August 1738, Strange was invited to succeed him, but declined the offer. He became Recorder of London in November 1739, and on 12 May 1740 he was knighted, along with Dudley Ryder, the Attorney General for England and Wales. He resigned as Member of Parliament for West Looe in 1741, but was reelected for Totnes in a by-election  in 1742.

In December 1742 he resigned as Recorder of London and Solicitor General, claiming ill-health, and also limited his practice as a barrister to the Court of King's Bench. In 1750 Lord Hardwicke convinced him to become Master of the Rolls, and he took his position on 11 January. On 17 March he was made a Privy Councillor. He served as master of the Rolls for four years until his death on 18 May 1754. After his death, his son John Strange, who had inherited (and sold) Grange House, published his father's court reports. He was buried in the Rolls Chapel, as was his successor Sir Thomas Clarke. His epitaph is

Here lies an honest lawyer,
and that is Strange.Epitaphiana: or, The curiosities of churchyard literature, being a miscellaneous collection of epitaphs with an introduction giving an account of various customs prevailing amongst the ancients and moderns in the disposal of their dead (1875) 262 (p132)

Family

On 14 May 1722 he married Susannah Strong, eldest daughter of Edward Strong the Younger sculptor and mason of St Paul's Cathedral. They had two sons and nine daughters. This included John Strange.

References

Bibliography

1696 births
1754 deaths
Members of the Middle Temple
Members of the Parliament of Great Britain for Totnes
British MPs 1734–1741
British MPs 1741–1747
British MPs 1747–1754
British MPs 1754–1761
Recorders of London
Masters of the Rolls
Solicitors General for England and Wales
Members of the Privy Council of Great Britain
Knights Bachelor